The Best of 25 Years is a compilation album by English musician Sting. It was released on 24 October 2011 through A&M Records.

Track listing

Charts

Weekly charts

Year-end charts

Certifications

References

2011 compilation albums
Albums produced by Rob Mathes
A&M Records compilation albums
Sting (musician) compilation albums